Rzgów Drugi  ("Second Rzgów", as distinct from the neighbouring Rzgów Pierwszy, "First Rzgów") is a village in the administrative district of Gmina Rzgów, within Konin County, Greater Poland Voivodeship, in west-central Poland.

References

Villages in Konin County